Zhang Guangjun (born 2 April 1975) is a Chinese former judoka who competed in the 1996 Summer Olympics and in the 2000 Summer Olympics.

References

1975 births
Living people
Chinese male judoka
Olympic judoka of China
Judoka at the 1996 Summer Olympics
Judoka at the 2000 Summer Olympics
Judoka at the 2002 Asian Games
Asian Games competitors for China
21st-century Chinese people